Kyle Cook (born July 25, 1983) is a former American football center in the National Football League (NFL). He was a member of the Minnesota Vikings and Cincinnati Bengals. Cook played college football at Michigan State University.

Early life
Kyle Cook is the son of Thomas and Nancy Cook; he has a sister, Sarah. Cook  played high school football at Dakota High School in Macomb, Michigan. He was a PrepStar All-American, ranked among the nation's top 60 offensive linemen by TheInsiders.com (No. 54) and named to SuperPrep's All-Midwest Team after being rated among the region's top 60 prospects (No. 55). He was listed among the state's top seniors by the Lansing State Journal (No. 14), The Detroit News (No. 20) and Detroit Free Press (No. 23) and named to the Detroit Free Press Dream Team and The Detroit News Class A All-State Team. Cook was selected to The Detroit News All-Metro Team and earned All-Metro East recognition from both The Detroit News and Detroit Free Press. He was a three-year starter for coach Mike Giannone at Dakota. Cook also lettered in basketball and track.

College career
Cook played from 2003–06, following a redshirt year in 2002. He started 11 games as a junior for a Spartans club that set a school record for passing yards (295.5 yards per game). As a senior, he was named second-team All-Big Ten Conference, leading the team in pancake blocks (48) for the second straight year. He 
closed out his Michigan State career with 35 consecutive starts, and played in the all-star Hula Bowl following the 2006 season

He majored in construction management at Michigan State. He was a member of the Sigma Alpha Epsilon fraternity.

Professional career
Undrafted out of college, Cook signed with the Minnesota Vikings as free agent on May 4, 2007. He was waived by the Vikings on September 1, 2007, and four days later was signed to the Cincinnati Bengals practice squad. He was added to the Bengals roster on December 31, 2007.

In 2008, he saw his first NFL action, playing in Games 2-6 on special teams, but was placed on Reserve/Injured list Oct. 17 due to a dislocated toe suffered in a collision during pregame warmups Oct. 5 against the  Dallas Cowboys.

In 2009, he earned the starting position in preseason, and was praised by coaches as the “glue” of a revamped unit as the Bengals captured the AFC North title. He helped the Bengals finish ninth in NFL rushing (128.5 yards per game), including a team record of eight games of 100 or more yards by individual backs. He aided in a 141-yard rushing game by Cedric Benson on September 20 at Green Bay. He helped lead fourth-quarter drives of 85 and 71 yards during a comeback win September 27 vs. the Pittsburgh Steelers. On October 11 at Baltimore, Cook and the rest of the offensive line helped Benson become the first player in 40 games to rush for 100 yards against the Ravens, and on October 25 Benson rushed for a career-high 189 yards vs. the Chicago Bears while aiding a sack-free performance up front.

In 2010, he contributed to the Bengals ranking second in the AFC and sixth in the NFL in fewest sacks allowed per passing play. The offensive line allowed no sacks for 100 straight passing plays to close the season, including the last three full games. Cook aided in an offensive output of 469 total yards October 24 at Atlanta (most by the Bengals since Game 2 of 2007).

He was released on March 11, 2014. He retired on August 21, 2014.

References

External links
Spartans player page
Bengals player page

1983 births
Living people
People from Mount Clemens, Michigan
Sportspeople from Metro Detroit
Players of American football from Michigan
American football centers
Michigan State Spartans football players
Minnesota Vikings players
Cincinnati Bengals players